Diakite Lamine is a Senegalese footballer who plays as a midfielder. He currently plays for Muktijoddha Sangsad KC.

References

External links

Living people
1983 births
Senegalese footballers
Place of birth missing (living people)
Association football midfielders
Senegalese expatriate footballers
Expatriate footballers in Tunisia
Expatriate footballers in Saudi Arabia
ES Zarzis players
Al-Ansar FC (Medina) players
US Monastir (football) players
Saudi Professional League players
Senegalese expatriate sportspeople in Saudi Arabia